Bharauli is a medium-sized village of Ballia district, Sohaon Block on Holy River Ganga. On one end of the village, there is a Krishna Temple (Thakurbadi) and at the other end there is a Ram Temple (Ram Mandir) Durga mandir. There are also three Shiv and Hanuman Temples. Of all the Hindu festivals, Most celebrated festivals are Rama Navami, Durga Puja, Diwali, Chhath observed with acts of worship, offerings to deities, fasting, vigil, rituals, fairs, charity, celebrations, Puja, Homa, aarti etc..

Demographics
The village has 427 families residing. The Bharauli village has population of 1905 of which 1001 are males while 980 are females as per Population Census 2011. Average sex ratio of Bharauli village is 950 which is higher than Bihar state average of 918. Child sex ratio for the Bharauli as per census is 809, lower than Bihar average of 935.

Mostly, Brahmin, Bhumihar & Yadavs are population of Bharouli residing with Harijans, Muslims,Teli, Domraja, and Other castes. Overall, a mix population.

Bharauli village has higher literacy rate compared to Bihar. In 2011, literacy rate of Bharauli village was 85.52% compared to 61.80% of Bihar. In Bharauli Male literacy stands at 91.93% while female literacy rate was 77.78%.

Occupation
Most of the population is agriculturist they grow cash crop such as Cauliflowers, Brinjals and Tomatoes.

Schools
Bharouli has three schools: 
 Girls Middle School 
 Boys Middle School 
 High School
 Intermediate College 
along with most of Private Schools.

References

Villages in Saharsa district